Luke Bambridge and David O'Hare were the defending champions but chose not to defend their title.

Marc-Andrea Hüsler and Sem Verbeek won the title after defeating Gerard and Marcel Granollers 6–7(5–7), 6–3, [14–12] in the final.

Seeds

Draw

References
 Main Draw

Winnipeg National Bank Challenger - Men's Doubles
2018 Men's Doubles